The Phone-paid Services Authority (PSA), known as PhonepayPlus until 1 November 2016, is the regulatory body for all premium rate phone-paid services in the United Kingdom. These are the content, goods and services that consumers can buy by charging the cost to their phone bills and pre-pay phone accounts.

It was founded as the Independent Committee for the supervision of Standards of Telephone Information Services at the request of three network operators (British Telecom, Mercury Communications, and Vodafone) as a response to public criticism of their profiting from adult premium rate content. It re-branded itself as PhonepayPlus in June 2007.

It regulates services using a Code of Practice, approved by Ofcom. This sets out the rules with which all providers of phone-paid services must comply. Among other things, it requires clear and accurate pricing information, honest advertising and service content, and appropriate and targeted promotions. The code is updated approximately annually.

The Phone-paid Services Authority investigates complaints about phone-paid services. Where it decides that its rules have been broken, it can fine the company responsible, bar access to its services, and even bar the individual behind the company from running other services under a different company name. Investigations and adjudications are free to consumers and are supposed to be fully independent.  
The Phone-paid Services Authority regulates services using the following number ranges: 070, 087, 090, 091, 098 and 118, plus five-digit mobile shortcodes.

Phone-paid Services Authority powers
When the Phone-paid Services Authority upholds a breach of its Code, the company responsible must immediately amend the service and/or its promotional material so that it complies with the Code. In most cases, companies found in breach of the Code will be charged to cover the cost of the investigation.

The Phone-paid Services Authority also has the power to impose the following sanctions: 
 formal reprimands;
 making companies come to the regulator for prior approval;
 ordering companies to pay full refunds to complainants;
 imposing fines;
 barring access to services;
 banning named persons from operating services.

Phone-paid Services Authority board
Chairs of the board have included:
Sir Louis Blom-Cooper QC, Lawyer
Brenda Dean, Baroness Dean of Thornton-le-Fylde, trade unionist
Sir Sir Peter North
Sir Alistair Graham, former chairman of the Committee on Standards in Public Life

Members of the board have included:
Matti Alderson, regulator
Dr. Howard Baderman, A & E consultant
Ruth Evans
Hugh Griffiths, telecom veteran
Jeremy Hallsworth, chief executive officer of BT agilemedia
Valerie Howarth, Baroness Howarth of Breckland, Child care activist and founder of Childline
Yvonne Light, Writer & journalist
Kate Marcus, Barrister
Claire Milne, Telecoms veteran
Mark Stephens (solicitor), lawyer, mediator and regulator
Howard Webber, consumer champion
Paul Whiteing, regulator

References

External links
 Official website

Communications authorities
Regulators of the United Kingdom
Telecommunications organisations in the United Kingdom